General Sir Alexander Hope GCB (2 December 1769 – 19 May 1837) was a British Army officer and the last Governor of the Royal Military College while it was at Great Marlow and the first Governor after its move to Sandhurst.

Military career 
Born the son of John Hope, 2nd Earl of Hopetoun, Alexander Hope was commissioned as an ensign in the 63rd Regiment of Foot in 1786.

He commanded the 14th Regiment of Foot at the skirmish at Geldermalsen, the Netherlands, in 1795 during the Flanders Campaign and was severely wounded, losing an arm and being left permanently lame. He was appointed Lieutenant-Governor of Tynemouth and Cliff Fort in 1797, Lieutenant-Governor of Edinburgh Castle in 1798 and Deputy Assistant Adjutant General to the Forces in Holland in 1799. He went on to serve as Deputy Quartermaster General to the Forces. He became Governor of the Royal Military College in 1812 and, although he stood down as Governor of the College in 1819, he became Governor of the College again in 1824 before he went on to be Lieutenant-Governor of the Royal Hospital Chelsea in 1826.

He was promoted full General in 1830. He was made Colonel of the 74th Foot in 1809, the 47th Foot in 1813 and the 14th Foot from 1835 to his death.

He was also Member of Parliament for Dumfries Burgh from 1796 to 1800 and for Linlithgowshire from 1800 to 1834.

Family 

In 1805 Hope married Georgiana Brown and together they had four sons, including George William Hope and James Robert Hope-Scott, father of James Hope, 1st Baron Rankeillour, and one daughter.

Upon his death, he was buried with Georgina in Aberlady churchyard.

Legacy
The Memorials to Governors in the Chapel of the present-day Royal Military Academy, Sandhurst, includes:
″In Memory of Gen. the Honble. Sir Alexander Hope, G.C.B., Colonel 14th Foot. Born 9th Dec, 1769; died 17 May 1837. Commanded the 14th Regiment at Gueldermalsen, 1795 ; wounded. D.A.A.G. to the Forces in Holland, 1799. Twice Special Envoy to the King of Sweden. Governor R.M. College, Great Marlow, 1811–12. Governor of this College, 1812–19, and again, 1824–26. Lieut.-Governor Chelsea Hospital, 1826–37.″

References

|-

|-

 

|-
 

|-
 

|-
 

|-
 

1769 births
1837 deaths
Alexander
British Army generals
Governors of the Royal Military College, Sandhurst
Knights Grand Cross of the Order of the Bath
Members of the Parliament of Great Britain for Scottish constituencies
British MPs 1796–1800
Members of the Parliament of the United Kingdom for Scottish constituencies
UK MPs 1801–1802
UK MPs 1802–1806
UK MPs 1806–1807
UK MPs 1807–1812
UK MPs 1812–1818
UK MPs 1818–1820
UK MPs 1820–1826
UK MPs 1826–1830
UK MPs 1830–1831
UK MPs 1832–1835